Zaijian Godsick Lara Jaranilla (born August 23, 2001, Gloria, Oriental Mindoro) is a Filipino actor and dancer who is best known for his role as the orphan Santino in May Bukas Pa, a 2009–2010 religious-themed teleserye based on and Philippine adaptation of 1955 Spanish movie  Miracle of Marcelino. Zaijian was also a cast member in the children's sketch comedy show Goin' Bulilit. He portrayed "Ding", the brother of the iconic Filipino superhero Darna in the TV series of the same name under ABS-CBN from August 15, 2022, to February 10, 2023.

Personal life
Jaranilla was born on August 23, 2001, in Gloria, Oriental Mindoro, to Glendelle Lara Jaranilla and Zenon Louis Jaranilla. He is the oldest in the family and has two younger brothers, Zildjian Godweevil and Zymic Demigod Lara Jaranilla. His parents separated in 2006 when he was only five years old, and residing currently with his father. He grew up in Quezon City, Metro Manila where he studied school prior to transferring to Colegio de San Juan de Dios in San Rafael, Bulacan, and spent his vacation days in Boac, Marinduque.

He was a student of General Roxas Elementary School in Quezon City until 2009. He stopped entering regular school for a year due to his schedule of taping of the drama series May Bukas Pa. As a result, he attended activities at various schools such as Wordlab E-Learning and Language Tutorial Services and Headway School for Giftedness until 2010. Jaranilla then resumed regular schooling at Angelicum College in June 2010 four months after May Bukas Pa ended on February 5 of the said year and one month before the premiere of his next on-screen appearance on a drama series which is Noah on July 12 of that year where he studied there until 2017. He again stopped schooling after his sophomore year in high school due to him struggled to juggle his requirements, and for him to continue his studies in the year level he was supposed to be in, Zaijian had to pass the Philippine Educational Placement Test of PEP Test from the Department of Education. He passed the exam allowing him to go straight to Senior High School. Currently, he is a student of Colegio de San Juan de Dios in the said municipality of Bulacan.

Career

2004–2014: Early work, career beginnings, and child actor
Jaranilla was discovered by a talent manager from RDB Talents and Events Management named Bryan Ancheta in 2004 at the age of 3. He started his career as a commercial model on TV commercials on various brands.

In 2008, he joined ABS-CBN where he became a contract artist of the network's talent management agency Star Magic. He appeared as guest cast on Goin Bulilit. He made his first appearance on anthologies on Mars Ravelo's Komiks Presents in 2008. He also became a regular performer for a Sunday variety show, ASAP and had multiple appearances on  It's Showtime and Maalaala Mo Kaya. From February 2, 2009, to February 5, 2010, he was cast as the main role for a TV series, May Bukas Pa as its protagonist Santino Guillermo, a boy who met Jesus Christ. His portrayal for the role pushed his name to fame, wherein he became a household name. This series received a special award at the 2009 Catholic Mass Media Awards, given by Cardinal Archbishop Gaudencio Rosales. The special award was received by Jaranilla together with his supporting actors. The series was also awarded an Anak TV Seal Awards Most Admired Program & Jaranilla was given the Male Makabata Awardee. The series gave Jaranilla the "Best Male New TV Personality" for 23rd PMPC Star Awards for Television, and "Natatanging Gawad Tanglaw para sa Sining ng Telebisyon" at the 2010 Gawad Tanglaw Awards.

Due to the success of May Bukas Pa, Jaranilla was given another roles within 2010 which are the voice of the fish Otep in Agua Bendita, immediate successor to May Bukas Pa and another religious-oriented series, and in a fantasy-adventure television series, Noah alongside Piolo Pascual and Jodi Sta. Maria, with the latter is where he made his on-screen appearance on a drama series five months after May Bukas Pa ended and aired until February 4, 2011. Later in 2010, he was voiced as Nico in his first ever film RPG Metanoia. In 2011, he made his first movie on-screen appearance alongside Vic Sotto and Bea Alonzo on Pak! Pak! My Dr. Kwak! portraying as Angelito, an angel that has fallen from heaven.  Later that year, he appeared in the Christmas-themed TV series Ikaw ay Pag-Ibig along with fellow child stars Mutya Orquia, Louise Abuel, and Xyriel Manabat and aired until January 27, 2012. In 2012, Jaranilla once again taken the lead role for melodrama series Lorenzo's Time alongside Carmina Villaroel. In 2013, he starred in the TV series Juan dela Cruz as Tonton. In 2014, Jaranilla was also starred in a TV series Ikaw Lamang as Young Samuel Severino.

2014–2021: Transition to teenage actor and teenage projects
On July 21, 2014, one month before Jaranilla became a teenage actor, he starred on Hawak-Kamay as Raymond "Emong" Agustin. A month later, Jaranilla debuted as a teenage actor upon reaching his 13th birthday. The drama series Hawak-Kamay is in production when Jaranilla reached the age of 13, making the first series that is in production during his teenage years.

In November 2014, Jaranilla revealed that he was eager to be a part of teenager-oriented shows after his stint at the family-oriented drama "Hawak Kamay". He stressed that he was willing to accept more matured project offered by ABS-CBN. He continued to appear on various anthologies during this time, with various episodes for Maalaala Mo Kaya in 2015. In same year, he appeared in the film Hamog portraying as Rashid, a Muslim boy who spent 48 hours of his young yet hurried life seeking help for his Christian friend who died in a cruel test of fate. The film was one of the 12 entries for Pista ng Pelikulang Pilipino (PPP). Jaranilla was praised on his acting skills as this film won the Outstanding Artistic Achievement Golden Goblet Award at the 2016 Shanghai International Film Festival, and earned him his first ever "Best Actor Award" nomination for Cinema One Originals Award. The film was also screened at the 15th New York Asian Film Festival. In the same year, Jaranilla returned to television on a minor role for Ang Probinsyano as Cocoy Amaba, and The Story of Us as Young Macoy in early 2016.

In 2018, Jaranilla appeared in Bagani portraying as Liksi. He starred alongside Liza Soberano and Enrique Gil. He also acted on his first digital series Story of My Life in 2019 produced by Big Reveal Digital and streamed via iWantTV. Jaranilla joined the list of Filipino guest actors in the American crime drama series Almost Paradise during the "Lone Wolf" episode. He also starred in Ang sa Iyo ay Akin.

In 2020, he expressed interest on portraying a role of a gay character and had at least two films lined up for him. Jaranilla took on the challenge of playing a gay character in the coming-of-age comedy directed by Jumbo Albano under Star Cinema, titled “Boyette: Not a Girl Yet”. In an interview in ABS-CBN News, Jaranilla stated “...I agreed to do the project because I wanted to change my image. I want people to know that I can portray different roles. Boyette has given me an opportunity to prove myself to people...”. Jaranilla acknowledges that his breakout role as orphan boy Santino in the 2009–2010 inspirational teleserye “May Bukas Pa” has left an indelible ink to his image. He may have been difficult to get away from his Santino role, but he is able to gradually do it by playing various roles in teleseryes and movies that were released and aired after "May Bukas Pa" ended on February 5, 2010 even during his child star days, allowing for him to exclaim that it is about to give his fans a chance to see in a different light. 

In July 2021, Jaranilla renewed his contract with Star Magic which allowed him to continue staying on ABS-CBN despite the difficulty of filming due to the COVID-19 pandemic in the Philippines and the absence of the network's broadcast franchise. He starred in "Maalaala Mo Kaya Loving 2 Care" first episode "Dialysis" with Nonie Buencamino directed by veteran director Jerry Lopez-Sineneng. He received generally positive reviews on his acting skills as he played as a Nurse fighting against chronic kidney disease.

2021–present: Adult actor, recent projects, and Darna
In August 23, 2021, Jaranilla debuted as an adult actor upon reaching his 20th birthday.

In 2022, Jaranilla was portrayed as Gio Illustre in The Broken Marriage Vow, a remake of a British series Doctor Foster. His role in the said series made him realize the importance of self-love. Later on that said year, Jaranilla was chosen by the network to portray the character of Ding, the younger brother and sidekick of the titular Filipino character, Darna, his biggest role to date. During the first week of the show, Jaranilla was once again praised by critics due to his acting skills. Jaranilla was also selected "Best Actor in a Supporting Role" at the Asian Academy Creative Awards for his performance on The Broken Marriage Vow and is one of the representatives for the Philippines on awards night that will be held on December 2022.

Other ventures

Philanthropy
In 2009, Jaranilla pleaded to everyone, candidates and voters alike, to support Millennium Development Goal (MDG) 4 which is to reduce child mortality. Millennium Development Goal No. 4 aims to reduce by two-thirds, between 1990 and 2015, the mortality rate of children, under-five years old. In 2010, ABS-CBN launched infomercials for the "Kapit Bisig sa Ilog Pasig" project, directed by award-winning director Brillante Mendoza spearheaded by ABS-CBN Foundation. Jaranilla participated in the project along with fellow talents Coco Martin, Kuya Kim Atienza, Karen Davila and Efren Peñaflorida. This was led by environmentalist, Gina Lopez and aims to promote the seven-year clean-up campaign of the Pasig River, a river in Metro Manila infamous for its dark and murky waters. In 2011, while promoting the movie "Pak! Pak! My Dr. Kwak", Jaranilla took stage in GMA Network's noontime show Eat Bulaga to play for the segment "Pinoy Henyo" together with co-actors Xyriel Manabat and Bea Alonzo. The appearance aimed to promote the movie and as well as donate the winning prize to fund "Silid-kaalaman", an Eat Bulaga! Library Project for underdeveloped schools in the Philippines. In 2022, ABS-CBN and Star Magic launched “Tulong-Tulong sa Pag-Ahon: Isang Daan sa Pagtutulungan” campaign, to seek financial support to help survivors of tropical storm Typhoon Odette. Jaranilla, together with other celebrities battled in sports and online games to seek sponsorships and donations. Through this campaign, ABS-CBN Foundation delivered 584 home repair kits while 207,649 families in Palawan and parts of Visayas and Mindanao have received food packs and fishermen restored livelihood by receiving boats and supplies.

Endorsements
Before joining ABS-CBN/Star Magic in 2008 and two years after he was discovered by a talent manager from RDB Talents and Events Management named Bryan Ancheta in 2004, he made his first appearance on a commercial in McDonald’s: Good Kuya in 2006. He then appears on Lactum MTV (With Supers) commercial in 2007 and a TV advertisement of Tide in 2008. After he became actor of ABS-CBN/Star Magic, he became an endorser of clothing brands which are Bench from 2009 to 2012 and Moose Gear from 2012 to 2016. He also became an endorser of Globe Telecom from 2009 to 2010, various Nestle products from 2009 to 2011, Argentina Andale Hotdog in 2011, and Converse. Jaranilla also appeared in a commercial of Morningfields at Carmeltown in 2009.

Discography

Studio albums
May Bukas Pa (Conversations Of Bro & Santino) (Star Music, 2009)

Filmography

Television

Digital series

Feature films

Anthologies

Commercials and Public Service Announcements

Awards and nominations

References

External links

2001 births
Living people
ABS-CBN personalities
Filipino television personalities
People from Oriental Mindoro
People from Marinduque
Star Magic
Filipino philanthropists
Filipino male child actors
Tagalog people
Star Music artists
Star Magic personalities